This is a list of international presidential trips made by Emmanuel Macron, the 25th and current President of France. National trips are not included. The number of visits per country where he travelled are:
 One visit to Albania, Andorra, Angola, Argentina, Armenia, Australia, Benin, Burkina Faso, Cameroon, Canada, Croatia, Cyprus, Democratic Republic of the Congo, Denmark, Djibouti, Estonia, Ethiopia, Finland, Gabon, Ghana, Guinea-Bissau, Hungary, India, Indonesia, Ireland,  Israel, Jordan, Kenya, Latvia, Lithuania, Malta, Moldova, Nigeria, Palestine, Poland, Republic of the Congo, Rwanda, Senegal, Serbia, Slovakia, Slovenia, South Africa, Sweden, Thailand and Turkey
 Two visits to Algeria, Austria, Bulgaria, Chad, China, Côte d'Ivoire, Czech Republic, Egypt, Greece, Iraq, Japan, Lebanon, Luxembourg, Mali, Mauritania, Morocco, Niger, Saudi Arabia and Ukraine
 Three visits to Netherlands, Portugal, Romania, Switzerland, Tunisia, United Arab Emirates and Vatican City
 Four visits to Qatar, Russia and Spain
 Six visits to the United States
 Seven visits to the United Kingdom
 Eight visits to Italy
 Twenty-three visits to Germany
 Thirty-seven visits to Belgium

2017

2018

2019

2020

2021

2022

2023

Future trips

Multilateral meetings

See also
 Foreign relations of France
 List of international presidential trips made by François Hollande 
 List of presidential trips made by Emmanuel Macron

References

Presidential trips
Lists of diplomatic trips
Macron
Lists of 21st-century trips
Lists of diplomatic visits by heads of state